Phud Vinichaikul (also known as just Luang Kraichingrith) (March 14, 1899 – June 11, 1964) was a Major-General in the Thai Army Commissioner participated in the Franco-Thai war and Commanding 3rd Division occupation the northern part of Malaysia during Thai annexation of northern Malay states.

References

1899 births
1964 deaths
Major generals
Phud Vinichaikul
Phud Vinichaikul
Phud Vinichaikul